Robert Frederick Willard is a retired United States Navy admiral who last served as the 22nd Commander, U.S. Pacific Command from October 19, 2009 to March 9, 2012. He previously served as Commander, U.S. Pacific Fleet from May 8, 2007, to September 25, 2009. Prior to that, he served as the 34th Vice Chief of Naval Operations from March 18, 2005, to April 2007. On March 9, 2012, Admiral Willard retired from the Navy after 39 years of service. On May 9, 2012, he was elected president and chief executive officer of the Institute of Nuclear Power Operations, succeeding retired Navy admiral James O. Ellis Jr.

Navy career

Willard is a Los Angeles native. In 1969, he graduated from East Longmeadow High School in East Longmeadow, Massachusetts, and received a Bachelor of Science degree from the United States Naval Academy in 1973. He also holds a Master of Science degree in engineering management from Old Dominion University and was a fellow at MIT's Seminar XXI.

He then joined Navy Fighter Weapons School Top Gun as Operations Officer and Executive Officer, as well as aerial coordinator for the Paramount film Top Gun.

In 1987, Willard reported to Fighter Squadron 51 (VF-51), where he served as executive officer and commanding officer of the Screaming Eagles, embarked in USS Carl Vinson (CVN-70). He subsequently attended Navy Nuclear Power Training before rejoining Carl Vinson as Executive Officer.

From March 2005 to April 2007, Willard was the 34th Vice Chief of Naval Operations. After, he was the commander of U.S. Pacific Fleet from May 8, 2007, until September 25, 2009, when he was relieved by Admiral Patrick M. Walsh. As the Commander, U.S. Pacific Fleet, he was responsible for the world's largest fleet command, encompassing  and more than 170 ships and submarines, 1,300 aircraft, and 122,000 Sailors, Reservists and civilians.

He was named a Distinguished Graduate of the U.S. Naval Academy in late 2018.

Popular culture
Willard appeared in and was a consultant for the 1986 film Top Gun.  He pilots the “MiG-28” that receives "the bird" from Goose and Maverick.

In March 2010, a video in which Rep. Hank Johnson expressed his concern to Willard that the island of Guam might "capsize" and "tip over" due to overpopulation of military equipment and personnel went viral, garnering hundreds of thousands of views from thehill.com, hotair.com and latimes.com and was ultimately seen over three million times.  Willard reassured the Congressman, "we don't anticipate that," for which he received wide popular admiration.

Awards and decorations

References

''This article contains material from the United States Federal Government and is in the public domain.

External links

 Navy Leadership Biography
 Rat-Pac Report Podcast Archive

1950 births
Living people
United States Naval Aviators
United States Navy admirals
People from Los Angeles
Recipients of the Legion of Merit
Honorary Officers of the Order of Australia
United States Naval Academy alumni
Vice Chiefs of Naval Operations
Recipients of the Defense Distinguished Service Medal
Recipients of the Navy Distinguished Service Medal
21st-century American naval officers
20th-century American naval officers
Recipients of the Meritorious Service Medal (United States)
Military personnel from California